The CONCACAF Gold Cup is North America's major tournament in senior men's football and determines the continental champion. Until 1989, the tournament was known as CONCACAF Championship. It is currently held every two years. From 1996 to 2005, nations from other confederations have regularly joined the tournament as invitees. In earlier editions, the continental championship was held in different countries, but since the inception of the Gold Cup in 1991, the United States are constant hosts or co-hosts.

From 1973 to 1989, the tournament doubled as the confederation's World Cup qualification. CONCACAF's representative team at the FIFA Confederations Cup was decided by a play-off between the winners of the last two tournament editions in 2015 via the CONCACAF Cup, but was then discontinued along with the Confederations Cup.

Since the inaugural tournament in 1963, the Gold Cup was held 26 times and has been won by seven different nations, most often by Mexico (11 titles). Haiti are the only one of those seven who are no longer in the Top 10 of the tournament's All-time Table.

Haiti have won the tournament once, as hosts in 1973. That the success was not due to the home advantage alone, but had shown good results at the previous and following editions (1971 and 1977), where they each ended up as runners-up on both occasions.

Overall record

Match overview

1973 CONCACAF Championship

1973 was the first of five times where the tournament was played as the final round of the CONCACAF World Cup qualifiers. It was also the first time this round was played as a "Hexagonal" – six times playing each other in a round-robin. This format has established itself in CONCACAF World Cup qualifiers since then.

The Haitian home tournament was held from November 29th to December 18th, 1973. The title holders and favorites from Mexico started off with two draws, against Guatemala and Honduras, and only won their third match against the Netherlands Antilles. Haiti on the other hand kept winning and after their fourth consecutive victory, a 2–1 over Guatemala with two goals by Emmanuel Sanon, the tournament standings were as follows:

With Mexico being a match and four points down, they would have had to win their next match, and then defeat Haiti in an all-or-nothing final on the last day. However, Mexico surprisingly lost 0–4 to Trinidad and Tobago, Mexico's highest defeat ever at a continental championship as of 2017, and Haiti was certain to win the tournament and qualify for the 1974 FIFA World Cup.

Haiti lost their final match 0–1 to Mexico, with the end table as follows:

References

Countries at the CONCACAF Gold Cup
Gold Cup